Atatláhuca–San Miguel Mixtec is a diverse Mixtec language of Oaxaca.

Dialects
Egland & Bartholomew found six dialects (with > ≈80% internal intelligibility) which had about 70% mutual intelligibility with each other:

San Esteban Atatláhuca [mib] + Santa Lucía Monteverde [mdv]
Molinos
Itundujía [mce]
Yosondúa [mpm] + San Miguel el Grande + Chalcatongo [mig]
Yolotepec [xtt]
Teita [xtj]

Ethnologue notes that two additional varieties Egland & Bartholomew had not looked at, Sinicahua [xti] and Tijaltepec [xtl], are about as similar.

References 

 Alexander, Ruth Mary. 1980. Gramática mixteca de Atatláhuca. Gramática yuhu sasau jee cahan ñayuu San Esteban Atatláhuca. Instituto Lingüístico de Verano. México. Series: Gramáticas de Lenguas Indígenas de México; 2.
 Macaulay, Monica. 1996. A grammar of Chalcatongo Mixtec, University of California Publications in Linguistics. .

Mixtec language